Catherine Kerr may refer to:
Catherine Kerr (environmentalist) (1911–2010), pioneer in environmentalism
Catherine Kerr (neuroscientist) (died 2016)
Catherine Kerr (athlete) (1921–2014), athlete from Manitoba, Canada

See also
Katharine Kerr (born 1944), American science fiction and fantasy novelist